Oryctes is a scientific name which may refer to:

Oryctes, a genus of beetles
Oryctes nevadensis, the sole species in the plant genus Oryctes